Omo Elemosho (English: Child of Elemosho) is a 2012 Nigerian film directed by Bayo Tijani and produced by Yewande Adekoya; the producer of the award-winning film Kudi Klepto. Omo Elemosho received 5 nominations at the 10th Africa Movie Academy Awards.

Cast  
Yomi Fash Lanso
Muyiwa Ademola
Bimbo Oshin
Toyin Aimakhu
Ronke Oshodi Oke
Seyi Ashekun
Lanre Hassan
Fausat Balogun
Afeez Eniola
Yewande Adekoya
Folashade Olona

References 

Nigerian drama films
Yoruba-language films
2012 films